Oakland City is an embankment rail station in Atlanta, Georgia, serving the Red and Gold lines of the Metropolitan Atlanta Rapid Transit Authority (MARTA) rail system. Opened on December 15, 1984, it has one island platform between two tracks. Both sides of the station are accessed via a pedestrian underpass beneath adjacent roadways and, in the case of the east underpass, a freight railway. Though at-grade, the steep embankment on which this station is situated gives it the appearance of an elevated station. This station mainly serves the Oakland City, Sylvan Hills and Capitol View neighborhoods of Atlanta.

Bus service is provided at this station to Barge Road Park & Ride, South Fulton Medical Center, Sylvan Hills, and Greenbriar Mall.

Station layout

Bus routes
The station is served by the following MARTA bus routes:
 Route 79 - Sylvan Hills
 Route 83 - Campbellton Road / Greenbriar
 Route 162 - Myrtle Drive / Alison Court
 Route 172 - Sylvan Road / Virginia Avenue

See also
Oakland – Jack London Square station

References

External links
MARTA Station Page
nycsubway.org Atlanta page
 Murphy Avenue entrance from Google Map Street View

Gold Line (MARTA)
Red Line (MARTA)
Metropolitan Atlanta Rapid Transit Authority stations
Railway stations in the United States opened in 1984
Railway stations in Atlanta
1984 establishments in Georgia (U.S. state)